Farrah are a British indie rock band. They have released four studio albums since 2001 and toured internationally since their formation.

History
After releasing their debut single "Terry" on the indie Noisebox Records label in the UK they were signed to The Police manager Miles Copeland III's Ark 21 Records for the release of their debut album, Moustache. The album was released in the UK, US, Europe and Japan and saw the band tour the world extensively to support it. When Ark21 shut down operation in the UK, their second album Me Too, was released on various independent labels throughout the world.

Farrah have maintained their independent status ever since. Recording at their own South London recording studio, producing their own videos and managing their online presence.

In addition to developing a harder rock sound, Me Too incorporated more diverse elements into their sound while still remaining true to the lyrically quirky three-minute, harmony-laden, melody-driven power pop sound of Moustache.

In late 2006, Farrah completed their third album, Cut Out and Keep. It was released in 2007 in the UK, Spain and Japan and accompanied by a world tour.

Since early 2007, Farrah has been working with the Japanese pop rock artist Kaela Kimura. They have so far composed two songs for her, and she has covered their song, "No Reason Why". One of Japan's leading rock bands, Asian Kung-Fu Generation has invited Farrah to appear at their own Nano-Mugen Festival on two occasions, most recently in 2009.

In 2009, they released their self-titled fourth album in Japan. The band now features former Cotton Mather drummer Dana Myzer in its lineup. The album (with a slightly different track listing ) was then released in the rest of the world in May 2010.

On 15 November 2011, the band included a cover of Europe's "The Final Countdown" on Engine Room Recordings compilation album, Guilt by Association Vol. 3.

In 2015, he worked with Shane Filan from Irish pop band Westlife for two tracks on the Right Here album, where it charted No. 1 in Irish Albums Chart.

In 2018, his co-written track "Brave" made it on to Steps singer Claire Richards' solo debut album, My Wildest Dreams.

Lead vocalist and principal songwriter Jez Ashurst has also written songs recorded by numerous artists including Gabrielle Aplin, Boyzone, Will Young, The Click Five, Natalie Bassingthwaighte, Brian McFadden, Hanson, Little Mix and Cliff Richard. Farrah co-founder Andrew Campbell also owns and runs the indie record label Lojinx.

Discography

Studio albums
 2001 – Moustache
 2004 – Me Too
 2005 – Stopgap Product (Japan only mini-album)
 2007 – Cut Out and Keep
 2009 – Farrah (Japanese version)
 2010 – Farrah
 2013 – Bees & Honey (demos, live & rarities compilation)

Singles
 1999 – "Terry" (UK)
 2000 – "Living For The Weekend" (UK)
 2001 – "I Wanna Be Your Boyfriend" (UK)
 2001 – "Tired Of Apologising" (UK)
 2004 – "Daytime TV" (France)
 2005 – "Tongue Tied" (UK)
 2005 – "Christmas Is Cancelled" 
 2007 – "No Reason Why" (Japan)
 2008 – "Can't Kick The Habit" (Japan)
 2010 – "Swings & Roundabouts" (UK)
 2011 - "Scarborough" (UK)

Compilations
 2001 – Zipped Up And Down Under 
 2001 – The Cornerstone Player 024
 2004 – Bob Harris Presents - Volume 5 
 2004 – Autumn Almanac 2004
 2005 – Asian Kung-Fu Generation presents Nano-Mugen Compilation
 2007 – International Pop Overthrow - Volume 10
 2007 – Sweet Relief
 2008 – Christmas Present
 2009 – Asian Kung-Fu Generation presents Nano-Mugen Compilation 2009
2011 – "The Final Countdown" (Europe cover) from Guilt by Association Vol. 3 
2013 – "Long Way Down" on Lojinx State of the Union label compilation sampler

References

External links
 

English indie rock groups
Musical groups from London
Musical groups established in 1999
English power pop groups
Lojinx artists
1999 establishments in the United Kingdom